The 2017 season was Johor Darul Ta'zim Football Club's 44th season in club history and 5th season in the 2017 Liga Super after rebranding their name from Johor FC.

Background

Background information
Johor Darul Ta'zim FC won their 2016 Liga Super after an impressive unbeaten campaign throughout 22 league actions. Tagged as "The Invincibles", JDT became the first Malaysian club to win the league titles for three consecutive seasons (2014–2016).

JDT still holds an unbeaten home ground record after extending the record up to 48 matches from 3 July 2012 (won against Sabah FA by 2–1) until 24 September 2016 which last they won against T-Team F.C. by 5–1).

JDT opened their defense of 2016 league campaign by retaining  Sultan Haji Ahmad Shah Cup title in the season opener after defeating 33-time Malaysia Cup winner Selangor FA in a 7–6 penalty shoot-out (1–1 draw in normal regulation time).

JDT lifted up the Malaysia FA Cup for the first time after a 2–1 win against promoted club PKNS FC held at Shah Alam Stadium on 14 May 2016.

Unfortunately, JDT failed to defend their AFC Cup after lost to India club Bengaluru FC in the AFC Cup Semi-finals with an aggregate 2–4.

Friendly matches

Competitions

Overview

Liga Super

Table

Results summary

Liga Super fixtures and results

FA Cup

Malaysia Cup

Group D

Bracket

AFC Champions League

Qualifying play-off

AFC Cup

Group F

Group stage

Zonal Semi-finals

Club Statistics

Appearances
Correct as of match played on 4 November 2017

Top scorers

Hat-tricks

Top assists

Clean sheets

Discipline

Cards

Transfers and contracts

In

Out

Contracts

Home Attendance 
All matches will be played at Larkin Stadium.

Attendance (Each Competitions)

See also 
 2013 Johor Darul Takzim F.C. season
 2014 Johor Darul Ta'zim F.C. season
 2015 Johor Darul Ta'zim F.C. season
 2016 Johor Darul Ta'zim F.C. season
 Johor Darul Ta'zim II F.C.
 Johor Darul Ta'zim III F.C.

References 

Johor Darul Ta'zim F.C.
Malaysian football clubs 2017 season